Țara Litua (meaning "The Litua Country") was a country from around Severin to the Olt River. The first mention of the country was in 1247, when Litovoi was its voivode. The country existed until 1330 when Basarab I founded Wallachia. 

The voivodes of the country were:

 Litovoi ; 1247 - 1277/9 ; occupies the countries of Ioan, Farcaș and Seneslau, killed by the Hungarians for being against them.
 Bărbat ; 1277/9 - 1290; the brother of Litovoi, vassal of Hungary.
 Thocomerius ; 1290/1300 - 1310 ; son of Bărbat.
 Basarab I ; 1310 - 1330 ; from 1330 voivode of Wallachia.

Note

History of Romania
History of Oltenia
Territorial evolution of Romania
Territorial evolution of Hungary